Montserrat competed at the 2017 World Championships in Athletics in London, United Kingdom, from 4–13 August 2017. The British Overseas Territory located in the Caribbean was represented by one male athlete, sprinter Julius Morris. Morris, 23, who attends Western Kentucky University in the United States qualified for the 200 metres event. An injury sustained during training however, forced Morris to withdraw from the event.

Results

Men
Track and road events

References

Nations at the 2017 World Championships in Athletics
2017
World Championships in Athletics